Oncotarget is a primarily oncology-focused, peer-reviewed, open access journal. The journal was established in 2010 and is published by Impact Journals. The editors-in-chief are Mikhail Blagosklonny and Andrei V. Gudkov.

Abstracting and indexing
The journal is abstracted and indexed in Index Medicus/MEDLINE/PubMed and Scopus. In 2022, it was re-indexed by Index Medicus/MEDLINE after being dropped in 2017. In 2018 Clarivate delisted the journal from the Journal Citation Reports and all of its other products because "the journal no longer meets the standards necessary for continued coverage", despite having listed the journal as a "Rising Star from Essential Science Indicators" only a few months prior.

Reception
The peer review process employed by the journal has been criticized by Jeffrey Beall, a university librarian and expert on predatory open access publishing, who also included the journal on his list of "potential, possible, or probable predatory scholarly open-access journals" in July 2015. Allegedly, journal editor Mikhail Blagosklonny responded by threatening to retract the papers of Beall's colleagues at the University of Colorado.

References

External links
 

Oncology journals
Publications established in 2010
English-language journals
Creative Commons Attribution-licensed journals
Biweekly journals